Below is a comprehensive list of songs recorded by American rock band Kings of Leon.

Original songs

References

Kings of Leon